Luciocyprinus langsoni is a species of cyprinid in the genus Luciocyprinus. It inhabits Vietnam and China.

References

Cyprinidae
Cyprinid fish of Asia
Freshwater fish of China
Fish of Vietnam